Jane Miller (born 1949) is an American poet.

Life
Jane Miller was born in New York and lives in Tucson, Arizona. She served as a professor for many years in the Creative Writing Program at The University of Arizona—including a stint as its Director—and is currently Visiting Poet at The University of Texas Michener Center in Austin. She has published ten volumes of poetry of which The Greater Leisures was a National Poetry Series selection. Who Is Trixie the Trasher? and Other Questions (Copper Canyon Press, 2018) is her most recent book of poems.

Her numerous awards include a Western States Book Award, a Lila Wallace Reader's Digest Award, a Guggenheim fellowship and two fellowships from the National Endowment for the Arts.

Awards
 National Poetry Series Selection for The Greater Leisures
 Western States Book Award for August Zero
 Two National Endowment for the Arts Fellowships
 Lila Wallace Reader’s Digest Award
 John Simon Guggenheim Memorial Foundation Fellowship
 Audre Lorde Award

Works
 
 "Life's Ironies," poets.org, 2014 
 
 
 
 
 
 
 
 Black Holes Black Stockings
 
 Heartbeats

Anthologies

Prose

 Seven Mediterraneans

Essays

 "Sea Level."

Ploughshares
"Scene", Ploughshares, Spring 1979
"Without a Name for This", Ploughshares, Spring 1979
"A Dream of Broken Glass ", Ploughshares, Spring 1979
"Eavesdropping at the Swim Club, 1934 ", Ploughshares, Spring 1979
"Blanks for New Things", Ploughshares, Winter 1990-91
"Warrior", Ploughshares, Winter 1990-91
"The General's Briefing", Ploughshares, Winter 1991-92
"Parts of Speech", Ploughshares, Spring 1996
"Humility", Ploughshares, Winter 2001-2

Reviews
Poet Jane Miller collaborates with artist Beverly Pepper on a highly personal journey through the debris of the poet’s crumbling relationship, and her mother’s descent into illness. Beautifully rendered poems and short chapters of poetic prose combine with Pepper’s chalk and oil drawings to form an intimate and unique meditation on the nature of love, of heartache, of the many midnights we, each and every one of us, live through and carry with us through our lives.

A major accomplishment of Jane Miller’s Midnights is that she rescues middle-of-the-night ideas from worn-out truisms and offers them as the torturous realities they can be in experience.

Jane Miller is hardly alone in demanding that the structures of her art reflect the compulsions of consciousness, but unlike poets who allow pallid abstraction to attenuate emotion and song, Miller, as late millennium supplicant, won't relinquish extravagance, seduction, rapture, as essential elements of a poem's brash presence. Her human figure, careening through its volatile relations, "charge card in hand," indebted and reverential, makes of shatter a kind of atomized coherence, a kinetic, compassionate form.

References

External links
"Trusting the Danger in the Poetic Process: A Conversation with Jane Miller", Greenbelt Review, Winter 2005

1949 births
Living people
University of Arizona faculty
American lesbian writers
American LGBT poets
American women poets
American women academics
21st-century American women writers